is a passenger railway station located in the city of Matsudo, Chiba Prefecture, Japan, operated by the private railway operator Shin-Keisei Electric Railway.

Lines
Gokō Station is served by the Shin-Keisei Line, and is located 7.4 kilometers from the terminus of the line at Matsudo Station.

Layout 
The station consists of a single island platform, with an elevated station building.

Platforms

History
Gokō Station was opened on April 21, 1955.

Passenger statistics
In fiscal 2018, the station was used by an average of 30,037 passengers daily.

Surrounding area
Chiba Prefectural Matsudo International High School
Matsudo City Daiyon Junior High School
Kashiwa City Southern Junior High School
 Matsudo City Takagi Daini Elementary School

See also
 List of railway stations in Japan

References

External links

  Shin Keisei Railway Station information

Railway stations in Japan opened in 1955
Railway stations in Chiba Prefecture
Matsudo